Kristján Örn Sigurðsson (often spelled Sigurdsson; born 7 October 1980 in Akureyri) is an Icelandic footballer who is a player-assistant manager for Þór.

Club career
He started his career at his local club ÍF Völsungur Húsavik, and moved to Stoke City in England as a teenager. Failing to grab a place on the first team, he returned to Iceland to play for KR. After the 2004 season he moved to SK Brann in Bergen, Norway where he plays as a defender. He showed acceptable defensive skills, but clear weaknesses in his passing game and general offensive play from his right back position. Before the 2006 season, Kristján was moved into the central defence, after both Ragnvald Soma and Paul Scharner were sold after the 2005 season.

Kristján showed that he is a supreme centre back with his great speed - he was tested to be the fastest Brann player on 40 metres relay before the 2006 season. He is also considered to have great strength in the air, even though he is shorter than most players who play in his position. Some commentators have compared Kristján's style of play to that of Argentine centre back Roberto Ayala, although both players differ greatly in quality. Kristján and his teammate Ólafur Örn Bjarnason started the season excellently and were nicknamed Ørneredet which means Eagle's nest (both players have Örn as their middle name, and Örn/Ørn is the Norwegian and Icelandic word for eagle). After several years in Bergen including the 2007 season which ended at the top position in the Norwegian Premier League, his contract with Brann ended after the 2009 season.

Kristján retired after 2014 season. However, he came out of his retirement in 2017 after his brother, Lárus Sigurðsson, took over as manager of Þór.

International career

Kristján made his debut for Iceland in 2003 and went on to earn 53 caps. On 9 February 2012 he announced his retirement from international football.

Career statistics

Club
Source:

International
Source:

Honours

Norway
Norwegian Premier League: 2007

Iceland
Icelandic Premier League: 2003

References

External links
 
 

1980 births
Living people
Kristjan Orn Sigurdsson
Kristjan Orn Sigurdsson
Kristjan Orn Sigurdsson
Kristjan Orn Sigurdsson
Kristjan Orn Sigurdsson
Stoke City F.C. players
Knattspyrnufélag Akureyrar players
Kristjan Orn Sigurdsson
SK Brann players
Expatriate footballers in Norway
Expatriate footballers in England
Kristjan Orn Sigurdsson
Eliteserien players
Norwegian First Division players
Hønefoss BK players
Association football defenders